Braian Ezequiel Toledo (8 September 1993 – 26 February 2020) was an Argentine javelin thrower who improved the World Youth Best in boys' javelin throw by more than six metres.

He won the inaugural javelin title at the 2010 Youth Olympics in Singapore and also won gold at the 2010 South American Youth Championships and 2009 Pan American Junior Championships.

In 2011 Braian protagonized a publicity spot for the campaign of Cristina Fernández de Kirchner in the presidential elections. In 2012 he participated, along with other Olympic athletes, in a campaign of Grandmothers of the Plaza de Mayo to recover the grandchildren who were robbed during the National Reorganization Process.

Since November 2016 he had Kari Ihalainen as coach and in April 2017 he moved to Kuortane, Finland, with the aim of improving his performance in view of the 2020 Olympic Games.

On 26 February 2020, Toledo died in a motorcycle accident. Among those to pay tribute to the athlete were Diego Maradona and president of the Argentine Olympic Committee, Gerardo Werthein.

Youth career
Born and raised in Marcos Paz, Braian Toledo grew up in a small one-bedroom house with his mother and two younger brothers. Athletics coach Gustavo Osorio gave a class at Toledo's school and invited him to join his training group. Initially focused on football – the most prominent and potentially profitable sport in Argentina – Toledo made the decision to focus solely on track and field instead at the age of twelve.

He managed a bronze medal at the South American Youth Championships in 2008. However, it was at the 2009 World Youth Championships in Brixen, Italy that he first made a name for himself. In a very tight final on 23 July, Toledo languished in seventh place until round five, when he threw a new personal best of 73.44 metres. This was enough to win him the bronze against boys a year older, just 56 centimetres from gold.

After that his results improved extremely rapidly. In July he took the silver medal at the 2009 South American Junior Championships in Athletics and then won the gold medal in the 2009 Pan American Junior Athletics Championships, throwing a new age-15 world best of 69.84m with the men's 800 gram implement. Later in the year, he made large improvements to his personal best with the youth javelin, with his eventual best mark of 79.25, thrown in Córdoba on 11 October, the top mark that year among throwers born in 1993 or later.

World Youth Bests
On 13 February 2010, Toledo improved his personal best by more than five metres with a first-round throw of 84.85 metres in Buenos Aires, Argentina. This by a comfortable margin eclipsed the world youth best of 83.02, set the previous year by Russia's Valeriy Iordan. He then made a huge improvement to the world best on 6 March 2010, in Mar del Plata, throwing a new record of 89.34, again on his first attempt. This mark was some 25 metres up from his personal best just a year before.

Toledo won the javelin at the inaugural 2010 Youth Olympics, contested in the city-state of Singapore in August 2010. His winning mark of 81.78 was almost five metres ahead of United States' Devin Bogert in second place. He won the national youth title in September with a throw of 85.64 m (his second best ever) and in October he competed at the South American Youth Championships, easily securing victory with the third best ever throw for a youth athlete.

Junior career
In late 2010, Toledo started competing with the 800 g standard javelin. He broke the Argentine juniors record with a 71.12 m throw on 23 October, and then broke his own record another four times during the 2010 Evita Games held in Mar del Plata on November, with his best mark at 73.07 m. He was awarded the Olimpia de Plata by Argentine sport journalists at the end of the year, acknowledging his position as the best Argentine in the sport of athletics. Despite Toledo's raised profile and the growing expectations nationally, his coach Osorio stated that both of them were more focused on training and improving. Osorio also pointed out that much had been achieved, in spite of the lack of high-quality facilities in the region.

In his last year as a junior, Toledo won the silver medal in the 2012 World Junior Championships in Athletics in Barcelona. He claimed the javelin title at the 2012 Ibero-American Championships in Athletics and the following month he threw an Argentine and South American junior record of 79.87 metres. He made his Olympic debut at the 2012 London Games, but did not progress beyond qualifying. He won the gold medal at the 2012 South American Under-23 Championships in Athletics with a championship record throw.

Competition record

Seasonal bests by year 

2009 – 69.84 m
2010 – 73.07
2011 – 79.53
2012 – 79.87
2013 – 78.66
2014 – 77.75
2015 – 83.32 NR
2016 – 81.96
2017 – 80.83
2018 – 78.57
2019 – 76.35

Notes

References

External links
 
 
 
 
 

1993 births
2020 deaths
People from Marcos Paz Partido
Place of death missing
Argentine male javelin throwers
Olympic athletes of Argentina
Youth Olympic gold medalists for Argentina
Youth Olympic gold medalists in athletics (track and field)
Athletes (track and field) at the 2010 Summer Youth Olympics
Athletes (track and field) at the 2012 Summer Olympics
Athletes (track and field) at the 2016 Summer Olympics
Pan American Games bronze medalists for Argentina
Pan American Games medalists in athletics (track and field)
Athletes (track and field) at the 2011 Pan American Games
Athletes (track and field) at the 2015 Pan American Games
Medalists at the 2011 Pan American Games
South American Games bronze medalists for Argentina
South American Games medalists in athletics
Competitors at the 2014 South American Games
Athletes (track and field) at the 2018 South American Games
World Athletics Championships athletes for Argentina
Road incident deaths in Argentina
Sportspeople from Buenos Aires Province